The Great Actor (Korean: 대배우; RR: Daebaewoo) is a 2016 South Korean film directed by Seok Min-woo and starring Oh Dal-su. It marked Oh's first starring role in a feature film.

Plot 
Stage actor Jang Sung-pil (Oh Dal-su) has performed in minor roles for 20 years and is currently playing the part of a dog in a children's play, but he dreams of becoming a great actor. As he watches fellow performer Sul Gang-sik (Yoon Je-moon), who used to act with him before making it big, Sung-pil believes that his dream is still possible. His hopes rise when world-famous director Cannes Park holds an audition for the character of a priest in his new film Devil’s Blood. When Sung-pil is accused of being an incompetent father and husband, he claims that he will be performing in the Cannes Park movie with Sul Gang-sik. To turn his lies into truth, Sung-pil embarks on a desperate journey to stardom, using every means possible.

Cast 
 Oh Dal-su as  Jang Sung-pil
 Yoon Je-moon as  Sul Gang-sik
 Lee Geung-young as Cannes Park
 Jin Kyung as Ji-young
 Ko Woo-rim as Kang Won-suk
 Choi Byung-mo as the director
 Kang Shin-il as Dae-ho
 Kim Chul-moo as Kyung-hee
 Park Ji-hwan as Seung-ji
 Ha Ji-eun as Young-suk

Release & Reception 

The film opened on March 30, 2016, topping the box office among domestic films and taking third place overall, just behind American films Zootopia and Batman vs. Superman. The film received mixed reviews, with most critics praising the performances and the story's unexpected depth.

References

External links
 
 

2016 films
South Korean comedy films
2010s Korean-language films
2016 comedy films
2010s South Korean films